Koney Williams is an American former Negro league shortstop who played in the 1940s.

Williams played for the Indianapolis Clowns in 1948. In nine recorded games, he posted three hits in 26 plate appearances.

References

External links
 and Seamheads

Year of birth missing
Place of birth missing
Indianapolis Clowns players
Baseball shortstops